Eublemma dimidialis is a species of moth of the family Erebidae first described by Johan Christian Fabricius in 1794. It is found in Indonesia, Pakistan, China, Micronesia, Nepal, Indochina, India, Japan, Sri Lanka, Taiwan, New Guinea and Australia.

Description
Its wingspan is about 22 mm. Body bright ochreous yellow. Forewings with the outer half length is bright rose pink, bounded inwardly by an oblique white line. A sub-marginal ochreous band not reaching the costa. Cilia whitish at extremities. Hindwings ochreous, fuscous towards outer margin, with patches of pink on vein 1 and at anal angle.

Ecology
Known food plants of the larvae are Fabaceae, such as mung beans (Vigna radiata) and cow peas (Vigna unguiculata).

References

Boletobiinae
Moths of Asia
Moths of Japan
Moths described in 1794